Groundsel is a common name for several plants and may refer to:

Members of the genus Senecio
Creeping groundsel, Senecio angulatus
Common groundsel, Senecio vulgaris
Welsh groundsel, Senecio cambrensis
York radiate groundsel, Senecio eboracensis
Eastern groundsel, Senecio vernalis
Heath groundsel, Senecio sylvaticus
Sticky groundsel, Senecio viscosus
Groundsel bush, Baccharis halimifolia
Members of Dendrosenecio, the giant groundsels
Members of Packera, a segregate of Senecio
Golden groundsel, Packera aurea (Senecio aureus)
Golden groundsel, Packera obovata (Senecio obovatus)
Members of Roldana, a segregate of Senecio
Members of Tephroseris

References